The Lumen is a high-rise apartment building in the Playhouse Square district of downtown Cleveland, Ohio. Completed in 2020, the 34-story,  tower sits at the southwest corner of Euclid Avenue and East 17th Street, adjacent to the Hanna Building and across Euclid from the Keith Building. It is the second new apartment building built in downtown Cleveland since the 1970s, following the construction of The Beacon in 2019.

The site
Formerly a large surface parking lot located across from the Playhouse Square theaters, The Lumen is the fruition of a long-held vision of Playhouse Square and its former president and CEO, Art Falco, to turn the district into a viable residential community. Playhouse Square hired development manager Hines, builder Providence, Rhode Island-based Gilbane and international architectural firm Chicago-based Solomon Cordwell Buenz to complete the project. In late 2018, the Cuyahoga County Council approved a $10 million dollar loan to Playhouse Square for the construction of the tower, which is estimated at $135 million. During excavation, crews discovered remnants of old foundations from other underground projects.

See also
List of tallest buildings in Cleveland

References

External links

Apartment buildings in Cleveland
Residential skyscrapers in Cleveland
Downtown Cleveland